Ronnie Cameron (born August 15, 1989) is a former American football defensive end. He was signed by the Chicago Bears as an undrafted free agent in 2012. He played college football for Hofstra University and Old Dominion University.

College career
Cameron played college football at Hofstra until they dropped football following the 2009 season. Ronnie then transferred to Old Dominion for his junior and senior seasons. After his senior season, he was named The Roanoke Times Defensive Player of the Year, won the College Football Performance Awards's Elite Defensive Tackle Award and selected as a 1st team FCS All-American by The Sports Network and the American Football Coaches Association.

Professional career

Chicago Bears
On April 29, 2012, Cameron signed with Chicago Bears as an undrafted free agent. He was waived by the team on August 11, 2012.

Cleveland Browns
On August 13, 2012, Cameron was claimed by the Cleveland Browns off waivers. On August 31, he was released from the Browns, only to be signed to their practice squad the next day. On November 2, he was promoted to the active roster, but was later waived on December 10.

Philadelphia Eagles
On December 12, 2012, Cameron signed with the Philadelphia Eagles to join their practice squad.

References

External links
Old Dominion bio
Chicago Bears bio
Cleveland Browns bio
Philadelphia Eagles bio

Living people
1989 births
American football defensive tackles
Cleveland Browns players
Hofstra Pride football players
Old Dominion Monarchs football players
People from Westbury, New York
Players of American football from New York (state)